The inaugural season of the Cuban National Series was won by Occidentales, composed largely of players from Pinar del Río.

In 1961, the post-revolutionary government outlawed professional sports, including the Cuban League, a small professional baseball league. The Cuban baseball league system was formed, with the Cuban National Series as its top level of competition.

Standings

References

 (Note - text is printed in a white font on a white background, depending on browser used.)

Cuban National Series seasons
Cuban National Series
1961 in Cuban sport
1962 in Cuban sport